Symmetry may refer to:

Generally:
Symmetry, the broad concept

In mathematics, science and technology:
Symmetry (geometry), of shapes in a metric space such as the plane
Symmetry in mathematics, of mathematical structures in general
Symmetry (physics), a physical or mathematical feature of the system (observed or intrinsic) that is "preserved" under some change
Symmetry in biology, the balanced distribution of duplicate body parts or shapes
Molecular symmetry in chemistry
Symmetry (Sequent Computer Systems), a line of SMP computers by Sequent Computer Systems
Symmetry Magazine, a Fermilab/SLAC publication covering advanced physics

In arts and entertainment:
Symmetry (band), American instrumental duo
Symmetry (film), a Polish film
"Symmetry" (Dead Zone), an episode of the television series Dead Zone
Symmetric scale, in music
Symmetry (Saga album), a studio album by Canadian rock band Saga
"Symmetry", a song by Little Boots on the album Hands

Other uses:
Facial symmetry, a component of attractiveness
"Symmetry", street name of salvinorin B ethoxymethyl ether, a dissociative drug
 Symmetry (horse)
 Symmetry (journal)